The 1973 World Table Tennis Championships mixed doubles was the 32nd edition of the mixed doubles championship.  

Liang Geliang and Li Li defeated Anatoli Strokatov and Asta Gedraitite in the final by three sets to one.

Results

See also
List of World Table Tennis Championships medalists

References

-